Drasteria coenobita is a moth of the family Erebidae. It is found in Libya.

References

Drasteria
Moths described in 1939
Moths of Africa